William Congreve (1670–1729) was an English playwright and poet.

William Congreve may also refer to:

Sir William Congreve, 1st Baronet (1742–1814), father of the inventor
Sir William Congreve, 2nd Baronet (1772–1828), inventor
William Congreve (died 1843), Lord of the Manor at Aldermaston
Billy Congreve (1891–1916), Victoria Cross recipient

See also
Congreve (surname)